Tsat Muk Kiu is a village in the North District, in the northwestern New Territories of Hong Kong. The village consists of Sheung Tsat Muk Kiu and Ha Tsat Muk Kiu.

Administration
Tsat Muk Kiu is a recognized village under the New Territories Small House Policy.

History
At the time of the 1911 census, the population of Ha Tsat Muk Kiu was 76. The number of males was 27.

References

External links
 Delineation of area of existing village Tsat Muk Kiu (Sha Tau Kok) for election of resident representative (2019 to 2022)

Villages in North District, Hong Kong